George Burnett Barton (9 December 1836 – 12 September 1901) was an Australian lawyer, journalist and historian.

Early life and education
Barton was born in Sydney, the second son of William Barton and Mary Louise Barton, and elder brother of Sir Edmund Barton. He was educated at William Timothy Cape's school and at the University of Sydney.

After a dispute with Professor John Woolley, he left for England, where he was admitted to the Middle Temple on 20 April 1857 and called to the Bar in 1860.

Career
Barton returned to Australia and became a journalist and was the first editor of the Sydney Punch. From 1865 to 1868 he was reader in English literature at the University of Sydney; his introductory lecture, The Study of English Literature, was published in 1866. Also in the same year appeared his Literature in New South Wales and Poets and Prose Writers of New South Wales, the first volumes of a bibliographical and critical character to be published in Australia. This made him, according to H.M. Green, "the founder of Australian literary criticism."

Barton went to New Zealand in 1868, and for about three years (1868-1871) was editor of the Otago Daily Times. Barton was known as "long Barton" in New Zealand to distinguish him from "little Barton"  or George Elliott Barton (unrelated) who was also a lawyer and (briefly) a Wellington MP.

Legal career
He practised for some time as a barrister and solicitor at Dunedin, and in 1875 published A Digest of the Law and Practice of Resident Magistrates and District Courts.He also edited the New Zealand Jurist.

Journalism career
He returned to Australia in the 1880s and did much writing for the Sydney Evening News and the Sydney Morning Herald. He was then commissioned by the government to write the History of New South Wales From the Records, of which he completed only the first volume, published in 1889. The latter was to have run into thirteen volumes but after a dispute over payment, Barton resigned. His book The True Story of Margaret Catchpole was published posthumously in 1924. He later moved to Goulburn, where he was the editor of the short-lived protectionist newspaper The Werriwa Times and Goulburn District News in 1901. He died in Goulburn Hospital on 12 September 1901 of influenza.

Notes

References
John M. Ward, 'Barton, George Burnett (1836 - 1901)', Australian Dictionary of Biography, Volume 3, MUP, 1969, pp 113–115.
E. Morris Miller & Frederick T. Macartney (1956), Australian Literature, Sydney, Angus and Robertson, p. 52.

External links 

 Works by George Burnett Barton at Project Gutenberg Australia
 

1836 births
1901 deaths
Australian journalists
Lawyers from Sydney
New Zealand editors
Australian editors
New Zealand women editors
Australian women editors
New Zealand magazine editors
Australian magazine editors
19th-century Australian historians
19th-century New Zealand lawyers
19th-century New Zealand writers
19th-century male writers
19th-century Australian lawyers
Australian literary critics
Deaths from influenza